Otilia Silvia Ruicu-Eșanu (born 20 August 1978 in Lugoj) is a retired Romanian athlete who specialised in the 400 metres. She represented her country at the 2000 Summer Olympics reaching the second round.

Competition record

Personal bests
Outdoor
400 metres – 51.47 (Funchal 2001)
800 metres – 2:02.58 (Barletta 2002)
Indoor
400 metres – 53.40 (Ghent 2000)

References

1978 births
Living people
Romanian female sprinters
Athletes (track and field) at the 2000 Summer Olympics
Olympic athletes of Romania
Universiade medalists in athletics (track and field)
People from Lugoj
Universiade silver medalists for Romania